Miroslav Blaťák (born May 25, 1982) is a Czech professional ice hockey defenceman. He is currently a free agent.

Blaťák began playing for his hometown team HC Hamé Zlín. He also briefly played for Dukla Jihlava. He was drafted 129th overall by the Detroit Red Wings in the 2001 NHL Entry Draft but did not sign a contract. He instead remained with Zlín until 2006 where he moved to Sweden and signed for Mora IK. In 2007, Blaťák signed for Salavat Yulaev Ufa in Russia.

Career statistics

Regular season and playoffs

International

International play

Played for the Czech Republic in:
2006 World Championships (silver medal)
2009 World Championships
2010 World Championships (Gold medal)
2010 Czech Republic Olympic hockey team

References

External links

1982 births
Avangard Omsk players
Czech ice hockey defencemen
Detroit Red Wings draft picks
Czech expatriate ice hockey players in Russia
HC Dukla Jihlava players
Ice hockey players at the 2010 Winter Olympics
Living people
Mora IK players
Olympic ice hockey players of the Czech Republic
Sportspeople from Zlín
PSG Berani Zlín players
Salavat Yulaev Ufa players
Severstal Cherepovets players
Czech expatriate ice hockey players in Sweden